Brian Flones (born September 1, 1959) is a former American football linebacker in the National Football League (NFL). He played for the Seattle Seahawks from 1981 to 1982, and played college football at Washington State in Pullman. Undersized, he walked on as a freshman in 1977 out of Burlington-Edison High School, and was a team captain of the Cougars as a senior in 1980.

References

External links
 

1959 births
Living people
American football linebackers
Washington State Cougars football players
Seattle Seahawks players